Satyāgraha (satya: "truth", āgraha: "insistence" or "holding firmly to"), or "holding firmly to truth", or "truth force", is a particular form of nonviolent resistance or civil resistance. Someone who practises satyagraha is a satyagrahi.

The term satyagraha was coined and developed by Mahatma Gandhi (1869–1948), who practised satyagraha in the Indian independence movement and also during his earlier struggles in South Africa for Indian rights. Satyagraha theory influenced Martin Luther King Jr.'s and James Bevel's campaigns during the Civil Rights Movement in the United States, as well as Nelson Mandela's struggle against apartheid in South Africa and many other social justice and similar movements.

Principles 
Gandhi envisioned satyagraha as not only a tactic to be used in acute political struggle but as a universal solvent for injustice and harm.

He founded the Sabarmati Ashram to teach satyagraha. He asked satyagrahis to follow the following principles (Yamas described in Yoga Sutra):
 Nonviolence (ahimsa)
 Truth – this includes honesty, but goes beyond it to mean living fully in accord with and in devotion to that which is true
 Not stealing
 Non-possession (not the same as poverty)
 Body-labour or bread-labour
 Control of desires (gluttony)
 Fearlessness
 Equal respect for all religions
 Economic strategy such as boycotts of imported goods (swadeshi)

On another occasion, he listed these rules as "essential for every Satyagrahi in India":
 Must have a living faith in God
 Must be leading a chaste life and be willing to die or lose all his possessions
 Must be a habitual khadi weaver and spinner
 Must abstain from alcohol and other intoxicants

Rules for satyagraha campaigns 
Gandhi proposed a series of rules for satyagrahis to follow in a resistance campaign:
 Harbour no anger.
 Suffer the anger of the opponent.
 Never retaliate to assaults or punishment, but do not submit, out of fear of punishment or assault, to an order given in anger.
 Voluntarily submit to arrest or confiscation of your own property.
 If you are a trustee of property, defend that property (non-violently) from confiscation with your life.
 Do not curse or swear.
 Do not insult the opponent.
 Neither salute nor insult the flag of your opponent or your opponent's leaders.
 If anyone attempts to insult or assault your opponent, defend your opponent (non-violently) with your life.
 As a prisoner, behave courteously and obey prison regulations (except any that are contrary to self-respect).
 As a prisoner, do not ask for special favourable treatment.
 As a prisoner, do not fast in an attempt to gain conveniences whose deprivation does not involve any injury to your self-respect.
 Joyfully obey the orders of the leaders of the civil disobedience action.

Origin and meaning of name 
The terms originated in a competition in the news-sheet Indian Opinion in South Africa in 1906. Mr. Maganlal Gandhi,  grandson of an uncle of Mahatma Gandhi, came up with the word "Sadagraha" and won the prize. Subsequently, to make it clearer, Gandhi changed it to Satyagraha. "Satyagraha" is a tatpuruṣa compound of the Sanskrit words satya (meaning "truth") and āgraha ("polite insistence", or "holding firmly to"). Satya is derived from the word "sat", which means "being". Nothing is or exists in reality except Truth. In the context of satyagraha, Truth, therefore, includes a) Truth in speech, as opposed to falsehood, b) knowledge of what is real, as opposed to nonexistent (asat), and c) good as opposed to evil or bad. This was critical to Gandhi's understanding of and faith in nonviolence: "The world rests upon the bedrock of satya or truth. Asatya, meaning untruth, also means nonexistent, and satya or truth, also means that which is. If untruth does not so much as exist, its victory is out of the question. And truth being that which is, can never be destroyed. This is the doctrine of satyagraha in a nutshell."
For Gandhi, satyagraha went far beyond mere "passive resistance" and became strength in practising non-violent methods. In his words:

In September 1935, in a letter to P. Kodanda Rao, Servants of India Society, Gandhi disputed the proposition that his idea of civil disobedience was adapted from the writings of Henry David Thoreau, especially the essay Civil Disobedience published in 1849.

Gandhi described it as follows:

Contrast to "passive resistance" 

Gandhi distinguished between satyagraha and passive resistance in the following letter:

Ahimsa and satyagraha
There is a connection between ahimsa and satyagraha. Satyagraha is sometimes used to refer to the whole principle of nonviolence, where it is essentially the same as ahimsa, and sometimes used in a "marked" meaning to refer specifically to direct action that is largely obstructive, for example in the form of civil disobedience.

Gandhi says:

Defining success 
Assessing the extent to which Gandhi's ideas of satyagraha were or were not successful in the Indian independence struggle is a complex task. Judith Brown has suggested that "this is a political strategy and technique which, for its outcomes, depends greatly on historical specificities." The view taken by Gandhi differs from the idea that the goal in any conflict is necessarily to defeat the opponent or frustrate the opponent's objectives, or to meet one's own objectives despite the efforts of the opponent to obstruct these. In satyagraha, by contrast, "The Satyagrahi's object is to convert, not to coerce, the wrong-doer." The opponent must be converted, at least as far as to stop obstructing the just end, for this cooperation to take place. There are cases, to be sure, when an opponent, e.g. a dictator, has to be unseated and one cannot wait to convert him. The satyagrahi would count this a partial success.

Means and ends 
The theory of satyagraha sees means and ends as inseparable obtain an end are wrapped up in and attached to that end. Therefore, it is contradictory to try to use unjust means to obtain justice or to try to use violence to obtain peace. As Gandhi wrote: "They say, 'means are, after all, means'. I would say, 'means are, after all, everything'. As the means so the end. Separating means and ends would ultimately amount to introducing a form of duality and inconsistency at the core of Gandhi's non-dual (Advaitic) conception.

Gandhi used an example to explain this: "If I want to deprive you of your watch, I shall certainly have to fight for it; if I want to buy your watch, I shall have to pay for it; and if I want a gift, I shall have to plead for it; and, according to the means I employ, the watch is stolen property, my own property, or a donation."
Gandhi rejected the idea that injustice should, or even could, be fought against "by any means necessary"—if you use violent, coercive, unjust means, whatever ends you produce will necessarily embed that injustice. However, in the same book Gandhi admits that even though his book argues that machinery is bad, it was produced by machinery, which he says can do nothing good. Thus, he says, "sometimes poison is used to kill poison" and for that reason as long as machinery is viewed as bad it can be used to undo itself.

Satyagraha versus duragraha 
The essence of satyagraha is that it seeks to eliminate antagonisms without harming the antagonists themselves, as opposed to violent resistance, which is meant to cause harm to the antagonist. A satyagrahi therefore does not seek to end or destroy the relationship with the antagonist, but instead seeks to transform or "purify" it to a higher level. A euphemism sometimes used for satyagraha is that it is a "silent force" or a "soul force" (a term also used by Martin Luther King Jr. during his famous "I Have a Dream" speech). It arms the individual with moral power rather than physical power. Satyagraha is also termed a "universal force," as it essentially "makes no distinction between kinsmen and strangers, young and old, man and woman, friend and foe."

Gandhi contrasted satyagraha (holding on to truth) with "duragraha" (holding on by force), as in protest meant more to harass than enlighten opponents. He wrote: "There must be no impatience, no barbarity, no insolence, no undue pressure. If we want to cultivate a true spirit of democracy, we cannot afford to be intolerant. Intolerance betrays want of faith in one's cause."

Civil disobedience and non-cooperation as practised under satyagraha are based on the "law of suffering", a doctrine that the endurance of suffering is a means to an end. This end usually implies a moral uplift or progress of an individual or society. Therefore, the non-cooperation of satyagraha is in fact a means to secure the cooperation of the opponent that is consistent with truth and justice.

Large-scale usage of satyagraha

When using satyagraha in a large-scale political conflict involving civil disobedience, Gandhi believed that the satyagrahis must undergo training to ensure discipline. He wrote that it is "only when people have proved their active loyalty by obeying the many laws of the State that they acquire the right of Civil Disobedience."

He therefore made part of the discipline that satyagrahis:
 Appreciate the other laws of the State and obey them voluntarily
 Tolerate these laws, even when they are inconvenient
 Be willing to undergo suffering, loss of property, and to endure the suffering that might be inflicted on family and friends

This obedience has to be not merely grudging but extraordinary:

American Civil Rights Movement 
Satyagraha theory also influenced many other movements of nonviolence and civil resistance. For example, Martin Luther King Jr. wrote about Gandhi's influence on his developing ideas regarding the Civil Rights Movement in the United States:

Satyagraha in relation to genocide 
In view of the Nazi persecution of the Jews in Germany, Gandhi offered satyagraha as a method of combating oppression and genocide, stating:

When Gandhi was criticized for these statements, he responded in another article entitled "Some Questions Answered":

In a similar vein, anticipating a possible attack on India by Japan during World War II, Gandhi recommended satyagraha as a means of national defense (what is now sometimes called "Civilian Based Defense" (CBD) or "social defence"):

See also 

 Civil disobedience
 Nonviolence
 Gandhi Heritage Portal
 People Power Revolution
 Resistance movement
 Salt March
 Constructive Program

References

External links 
 'Satyagraha 100 Years Later' – a retrospective with Arun Gandhi from Democracy Now!
 The Story of Satyagraha by Dr. Jyotsna Kamat
 GandhiPoetics.com – a site that analyzes and previews the poetry associated with Gandhi's Satyagraha movement.
 Satyagraha in South Africa

Activism by type
Ethical schools and movements
Gandhism

Pacifism in India
Truth